The 1980 National Panasonic South Australian Open, also known as the National Panasonic Women's  Open, was a women's tennis tournament played on outdoor grass courts at the Memorial Drive in Adelaide, Australia that was part of the category AAA of the Colgate Series of the 1980 WTA Tour. It was the inaugural edition of the National Panasonic Open and was held from 8 December through 14 December 1980. First-seeded Hana Mandlíková won the singles title and earned $22,000 first-prize money.

Finals

Singles
 Hana Mandlíková defeated  Sue Barker 6–2, 6–4
 It was Mandlíková's 6th singles title of the year and the 13th of her career.

Doubles
 Pam Shriver /  Betty Stöve defeated  Sue Barker /  Sharon Walsh 6–4, 6–3

Prize money

References

External links
 ITF tournament edition details

National Panasonic Classic
National Panasonic Open
National Panasonic Classic
National Panasonic Classic
National Panasonic Classic, 1980